St. Gereon's Basilica (Basilika Sankt Gereon) is a German Roman Catholic church in Cologne, dedicated to Saint Gereon, and designated a minor basilica on 25 June 1920. The first mention of a church at the site, dedicated to St. Gereon, appears in 612. However, the building of the current choir gallery, apse, and transepts occurred later, beginning under Archbishop Arnold II von Wied in 1151 and ending in 1227.  It is one of twelve great churches in Cologne that were built in the Romanesque style. 

St. Gereon has a highly irregular plan, the nave being covered by a decagonal oval dome, 21.0 m long and 16.9 m wide, completed in 1227 on the remains of Roman walls, which are still visible. It is the largest dome built in the West between the erection of the Hagia Sophia in the 6th century and the Duomo of Florence in the 15th century.

Ernst Seifert built an organ there in 1898. In the 20th century, the architect Andreas Dilthey worked on its interior.

Archaeological excavation has revealed the presence of an earlier structure from the fourth century, possibly a funerary building that was converted into a church by the sixth century. This original church was perhaps called the church of the Golden Saints (ad sanctos aureos) by Gregory of Tours.

See also 
 Twelve romanesque churches of Cologne
 List of Roman domes
 List of basilica churches in Germany
 Cloth of St Gereon, that hung in the choir area, the oldest surviving European tapestry
 History of medieval Arabic and Western European domes
 Gereon
 Saint-Géréon, France

References

External links 

 www.stgereon.de
 
 baukunst-nrw: St. Gereon Köln

4th-century churches
Churches completed in 1227
Cologne, St Gereon
Innenstadt, Cologne
Basilica churches in Germany
Cologne, St Gereon
Roman Catholic churches in Cologne
Church buildings with domes